Clintonia andrewsiana is a species of flowering plant in the lily family Liliaceae. The species was discovered by John Milton Bigelow in 1854 and described by John Torrey in 1856. The specific epithet andrewsiana honors Timothy Langdon Andrews (1819–1908), a "gentleman who assiduously examined the botany" of California during the mid-19th century. The species is commonly known as Andrews clintonia or red clintonia, where the latter refers to the color of the flowers. In California, it is also known as bluebead lily or western bluebead lily, not to be confused with C. borealis, which is likewise known as bluebead lily. The Pomo people of northern California considered the plant to be poisonous.

Description

Clintonia andrewsiana is a perennial herbaceous plant that spreads by means of underground rhizomes. The tall, erect inflorescence consists of a terminal umbel with 10–20 flowers and up to three lateral umbels with 2–4 flowers each.

Distribution and habitat

Clintonia andrewsiana is found along the West Coast of the United States, from Monterey County in central California north to Curry County in southwestern Oregon. It prefers the shady, moist areas of the coastal redwood forests.

The range of C. andrewsiana overlaps with that of C. uniflora in Humboldt County and Del Norte County in northwestern California and Curry County in Oregon, but the two species are readily distinguished by their flowers. C. andrewsiana has multiple flowers arranged in one or more umbels while C. uniflora has a single flower with white tepals. The tepals of C. andrewsiana are a deep claret red.

See also

 Bead lily
 Bluebead (disambiguation)
 List of plants known as lily

References

External links

 
 

andrewsiana
Flora of California
Flora of Oregon
Flora of the Klamath Mountains
Endemic flora of the United States
Natural history of the California Coast Ranges
Plants described in 1857
Taxa named by John Torrey